Ondřej Bank (born 27 October 1980) is a Czech retired World Cup alpine ski racer.

Born in Zábřeh na Moravě, Bank began his international career in 1995 when he first competed at the Junior World Championship. His first World Cup race was in January 2001. Bank is a specialist in the combined event, and his two podiums came at Beaver Creek and Kitzbühel.

His biggest achievement is fifth place in the Giant Slalom at the 2014 Winter Olympics in Sochi. At the time, it was the best Czech Olympic skiing result since Peter Jurko placed fifth in the combined in 1988 at Calgary Olympics. On 22 February 2016 he announced that he would retire from skiing after bad results in the 2016 season. He didn't win any points with 10 starts. His last race was on 16 January 2016, a downhill in Wengen.

World Cup results

Season standings

Race podiums 

 2 podiums – (2 SC)

World Championships results

Olympic results

References

External links
 
 Ondřej Bank World Cup standings at the International Ski Federation
 
 
 
 Nordica Skis – race athletes

1980 births
Czech male alpine skiers
Alpine skiers at the 2002 Winter Olympics
Alpine skiers at the 2006 Winter Olympics
Alpine skiers at the 2010 Winter Olympics
Olympic alpine skiers of the Czech Republic
Living people
Alpine skiers at the 2014 Winter Olympics
People from Zábřeh
Sportspeople from the Olomouc Region